The men's singles squash competitions at the 2022 Commonwealth Games in Birmingham, England took place between July 29 and August 3 at University of Birmingham Hockey and Squash Centre. A total of 53 competitors from 26 nations took part.

Schedule
The schedule is as follows:

Seeds
The seeds for the competition were revealed on July 19, 2022.

Results
The draw is as follows:

Finals

Top half

Section 1

Section 2

Bottom half

Section 3

Section 4

References

External link
Results

Squash at the 2022 Commonwealth Games